ChinaSat 12 communications satellite is wholly owned by China Satellite Communications, with part of its communications payload leased or rented by SupremeSAT, a Sri Lankan company to be marketed to potential users as SupremeSAT-I. Once operational, it will provide communications services for the China, Sri Lanka, East Asia, South Asia, Middle East, Africa, Australia and China sea area, the Indian Ocean region.

ChinaSat 12 was also known as Apstar 7B (as a backup of Apstar 7), but acquired by China Satellite Communications from its subsidiary APT Satellite Holdings in 2010. However, APT Satellite Holdings was contracted by its parent company as the operator of ChinaSat 12.

Orbit
Following launch on 27 November 2012, the satellite was placed into geosynchronous orbit and located at 51.5° East while being tested. 

The satellite was built by Thales Alenia Space and has a designed life of 15 years.

Gallery

References

Communications satellites in geostationary orbit
Spacecraft launched in 2012
Satellites of China
Communications satellites of China
2012 in China
Spacecraft launched by Long March rockets